Guillermo Gorostiza Paredes (15 February 1909 – 23 August 1966) was a Spanish footballer who played as a forward.

In a 14-year professional career, he played for Athletic Bilbao and Valencia, amassing La Liga totals of 255 games and 178 goals and winning 11 major titles with the two teams combined.

Gorostiza appeared for Spain at the 1934 World Cup.

Club career

Athletic Bilbao
Gorostiza was born in Santurtzi, Biscay. He played youth football for Chávarri de Sestao and Zugazarte, beginning his senior career with Arenas Club de Getxo and Racing de Ferrol (one season apiece) before signing for Athletic Bilbao in 1929. He made his La Liga debut on 1 December 1929 against Real Madrid, and scored a combined 37 league goals in his first two seasons (in 36 matches) as the club won back-to-back national championships, adding two Copa del Rey trophies.

Gorostiza was a member of an Athletic attack (coached by Englishman Fred Pentland) that also included Bata, José Iraragorri, Chirri II, Lafuente and Víctor Unamuno, and would be remembered as one of the best in the club's history; he won two Pichichi awards as league top goalscorer while with the club. He scored the last goal in the 1933 Spanish Cup final, a 2–1 victory over Real Madrid in Barcelona.

During the Spanish Civil War, Gorostiza played with the Euskadi XI, a team which was put together at the suggestion of José Antonio Aguirre, the president of the Basque Country and a former Athletic player. The side went on tour to the Soviet Union to raise funds for the Basque cause, as well as throughout Europe and Mexico, even entering the Mexican league during the 1938–39 campaign, although by then Gorostiza was no longer with the squad.

Valencia and later years
On returning to Spain, Gorostiza returned to Athletic as they attempted to rebuild their squad using younger players, featuring in the 1939 Copa del Generalísimo and the full 1939–40. He then joined Valencia CF as the young Che squad had managed to remain intact during the conflict and now, aided by the veteran (31), eventually won two leagues and one cup, with the player netting in double digits in four of his six seasons, with a best of 20 goals in 24 games in 1941–42.

After leaving the Mestalla Stadium, Gorostiza played for Barakaldo CF during the 1946–47 campaign, in Segunda División, and then retired at the age of 38. However, he twice came out of retirement, with CD Logroñés and Juvencia Trubia, finally calling it quits in 1951. While with Juvencia, he was paid in bottle of coke from a nearby factory which he would then have to sell to make money.

International career
While at Athletic, Gorostiza made his debut for Spain, appearing against Czechoslovakia on 14 June 1930. He represented the nation at the 1934 FIFA World Cup, playing in the 3–1 win against Brazil and the 1–1 draw against Italy; he missed the replay against the latter, a 0–1 defeat.

Gorostiza earned the last of his 19 caps on 12 December 1941, in a friendly match with Switzerland in Valencia.

Death
Gorostiza began to struggle with alcoholism while still playing, sometimes turning up to games drunk or not having slept, and this eventually led to severe economic problems. He was found dead by a nun on 24 August 1966 at the Santa María en Santurce nursing home in Bilbao, aged 57.

Filmography
Gorostiza played Goro in ¡¡Campeones!! (1943), and himself in Juguetes rotos (1966).

Career statistics

Honours
Athletic Bilbao
La Liga: 1929–30, 1930–31, 1933–34, 1935–36
Copa del Rey: 1930, 1931, 1932, 1933
Biscay Championship: 1930–31, 1931–32, 1932–33, 1933–34, 1934–35, 1938–39, 1939–40

Valencia
La Liga: 1941–42, 1943–44
Copa del Generalísimo: 1941

Individual
Pichichi Trophy: 1929–30, 1931–32

References

External links

1909 births
1966 deaths
People from Santurtzi
Sportspeople from Biscay
Spanish footballers
Footballers from the Basque Country (autonomous community)
Association football forwards
La Liga players
Segunda División players
Tercera División players
Arenas Club de Getxo footballers
Racing de Ferrol footballers
Athletic Bilbao footballers
Valencia CF players
Barakaldo CF footballers
CD Logroñés footballers
Spain international footballers
1934 FIFA World Cup players
Basque Country international footballers
Pichichi Trophy winners
Spanish football managers
Segunda División managers
Barakaldo CF managers
CD Logroñés managers